Naum Borisovich Birman (1924—1989) was a Soviet director of theater and cinema, screenwriter.

Cavalier of the  Order of Friendship of Peoples (1986).

He worked as an actor and director in the Leningrad theaters, director of the productions of Arkady Raikin.

He was buried at the Memorial Cemetery in   Komarovo near Leningrad.

First wife Emilia Popova (1928—2001), actress of Tovstonogov Bolshoi Drama Theater. Son Anatoly Popov, actor. Since the second marriage there is a son Boris (born 1966).

Filmography 
1965 — Accident
1967 —  Chronicles of a Dive Bomber
1970 —  The Magic Power
1972 — A Teacher of Singing
1973 — I Serve On the Border
1975 — Step Forward
1978 — The Trace on the Earth
1979 — Three Men in a Boat
1980 — We Looked in the Death's Face
1983 — Black and White Magic
1985 — The Sunday Daddy
1986 — Sunday's Father
1989 — Cyrano de Bergerac

References

External links
 
 
 100 лучших фильмов всех времён

Soviet film directors
Soviet screenwriters
Soviet theatre directors
Recipients of the Order of Friendship of Peoples
Soviet Jews
1924 births
1989 deaths
20th-century screenwriters